Hashim Safi Al Din (also transliterated Hashem Safieddine) (born 1964) is a Lebanese Shia cleric, senior Hezbollah official and a maternal cousin of the secretary general of Hezbollah, Hassan Nasrallah. He is the head of Hezbollah's Executive Council and a Specially Designated Global Terrorist, and generally considered the "number two" in Hezbollah.

Early life
Hashim Safi Al Din was born in 1964 in Deir Qanoun En Nahr, south Lebanon, to a respected Shia family. He is a maternal cousin of Hassan Nasrallah. His brother, Abdallah Safi Al Din, is Hezbollah's representative to Iran.

Hashim Safi Al Din studied theology in Najaf, Iraq, and in Qum, Iran, together with Nasrallah, until he was recalled to Lebanon by Hassan Nasrallah in 1994.

Career
In 1995 Hashim Safi Al Din was promoted to the Majlis al-Shura (Consultative Assembly), the highest council in Hezbollah. He was also appointed head of the al Majlis al Jihadi. The Executive Council, of which he is president, oversees Hezbollah's political, social, and educational activities.

Al Din is among three major leaders of Hezbollah, the other two are Hassan Nasrallah and Naim Qassem. He is also regarded as second only to Nasrallah.

In 2006 he was reportedly promoted by Iran as a possible successor to Hassan Nasrallah for the post of Secretary-General of Hezbollah.

Al Din is one of six clerics who are members of the shura council of Hezbollah. He is also the head of the executive council of the group (also known as Shura Tanfiziyah), to which he was elected in the general assembly meeting in July 2001. In addition, he is one of nine members of the deciding consultative council (Shura al-Qarar), which is the top body of the group.

In October 2008, Al Din was elected to succeed Nasrallah as secretary general of Hezbollah in the general meeting. His appointment as heir apparent to Nasrallah was supported by Iranians. In 2009, Al Din was again elected to the shura council. He was appointed Hezbollah's military commander of Southern Lebanon region in November 2010.

In 2017 Al Din was designated a terrorist by the US Department of State. The same year in May he was subject to the sanctions imposed by the U.S. and some of Arab countries, including Saudi Arabia, the United Arab Emirates and Bahrain in addition to other nine senior Hezbollah figures.

Personal life
In June 2020 his son, Sayyed Reza Hashim Safi Al Din, married Zeinab Soleimani, daughter of former Qods Force Commander Qassem Soleimani.

References

External links

20th-century Lebanese people
21st-century Lebanese people
1964 births
Living people
Hezbollah politicians
Individuals designated as terrorists by the United States government
Lebanese Shia clerics